The ACB Best Young Player Award, previously known as the ACB Rising Star Award, from 2005 to 2013, is an award for the top-tier professional basketball league in Spain, the Spanish ACB League. The award has been given since the 2004–05 ACB season.

Currently, to be eligible for the award, players must be 22 years old or younger, and must have played in at least half of the league's games during the season, with an average playing time per game of at least 10 minutes. An All-ACB Best Young Players Team is also chosen.

Rising Star award winners (2004–13)

The following is a list of the all-time ACB Rising Star Award winners.
Player nationalities by national team.

Best Young Player award winners (2013–present)

The following is a list of the all-time ACB Best Young Player Award winners.
Player nationalities by national team.

All-ACB Best Young Players Team
Player nationalities by national team.

See also
ACB Most Valuable Player Award
ACB Finals Most Valuable Player Award
All-ACB Team

References

External links
Spanish League Official Website 

     
Liga ACB awards